Harold Rhode (born September 19, 1949) is an American specialist on the Middle East. Harold Rhode studied in and traveled extensively throughout the Islamic world and has studied and done research in universities and libraries in Egypt, Israel, Syria, Jordan, Iran, Afghanistan, Turkey, Uzbekistan, and Kazakhstan. He speaks Arabic, Hebrew, Persian, French, and Turkish.

Early life and education 
Harold Rhode was born on September 19, 1949, in Philadelphia. He received his Ph.D. from Columbia University in Islamic History, specializing in the history of the Turks, Arabs, and Iranians. Rhode was studying at Ferdosi University in Iran during the early stages of the revolution that brought Ayatollah Khomeni to power. He has spent his life trying to find ways that Muslims and non-Muslims can co-exist without fighting.

Career 
Harold Rhode taught Islamic history at the University of Delaware as an adjunct professor from 1979 until 1981. In May 1982, he joined the Office of the Under Secretary of Defense for Policy at the Pentagon as an adviser on the Islamic world with a special emphasis on Turkey, Iran, and Iraq. He retired from this position in 2010. During his tenure he wrote papers on how to understand, negotiate, and deal with Turkey, Iran, Central Asia, and other Arab countries.

During the Gulf War, Rhode served as the Turkish Desk officer in the Office of the Secretary of Defense (OSD). While having this position he wrote papers for OSD officials on Iran, Iraq, and other Middle Eastern issues.

Between 1991 and 1994 Harold Rhode served on the US Department of Defense’s Policy Planning Staff. While in this position he wrote strategy papers on Middle Eastern and Central Asian topics.

From 1994 until 2010 Harold Rhode worked as an adviser on Islamic Affairs in the Office of Net Assessment, an in-house think tank for the Pentagon.

Probe 

Rhode was a subject of a probe conducted by the Senate Intelligence Committee for a U.S. government-authorized meeting he and Larry Franklin had in Rome in late 2001 with Manucher Ghorbanifar, who was part of the Iran-Contra scandal.

References

External links 
The Administration and Population of the Sancak of Safed in the Sixteenth Century , Harold Rhode, for Ph.D, Columbia University, 1979. 
 On the "Crazies" in Iran Interview with Harold Rhode, The Jerusalem Post
 Laurence, L. (2012). "Shiism and Politics in the Middle East". London: Hurst. Reviewed by Harold Rhode in  Israel Journal of Foreign Affairs, (2014) VIII:I, 149-154

1949 births
20th-century American Jews
Columbia University alumni
Living people
American scholars of Islam
21st-century American Jews